This is a list of airlines which have an Air Operator Certificate issued by the Civil Aviation Authority of Bangladesh.

Scheduled airlines

Charter airlines

Cargo airlines

See also
List of airlines
List of defunct airlines of Bangladesh
List of defunct airlines of Asia
List of airports in Bangladesh

References

 
Bangladesh
Airlines
Airlines
Bangladesh